Ruprecht may refer to:

Ruprecht (name)
Ruprecht Karl University of Heidelberg, a university in Germany
Sankt Ruprecht-Falkendorf, a village in Austria
Sankt Ruprecht an der Raab, a  municipality in the district of Weiz in Styria, Austria
Vandenhoeck & Ruprecht, a German publishing company
Ruprecht 147, star cluster in the Milky Way galaxy

See also
Rupe (surname)